Coimbatore, also known as Kovai, is a major city in the Indian state of Tamil Nadu.

Coimbatore may also refer to:

 Coimbatore district
 Coimbatore International Airport
 Coimbatore Institute of Technology
 Coimbatore bypass
 Coimbatore Wet Grinder
 Coimbatore Municipal Corporation
 Coimbatore Mappillai
 Coimbatore Junction railway station
 Coimbatore (Lok Sabha constituency)
 Coimbatore metropolitan area
 Coimbatore Integrated Bus Terminus
 Coimbatore Metro